Plaridel Airport (Filipino: Paliparan ng Plaridel)  is an airport serving the general area of Plaridel, located in the province of Bulacan in the Philippines.  The Civil Aviation Authority of the Philippines, a body of the Department of Transportation that is responsible for the operations for 81 out of 85 government-owned airports, manages the facility and classifies it as a community airport.

It is the only public airport in the Mega Manila area solely dedicated to general aviation. Among community airports it is one of the few which has taxiways that extend to  the ends of a runway.

History
The airport was opened in 1935 and was extensively used during World War II, when it was used as a ground for training fighter pilots.

Today, the airport is still used extensively as a training facility for all types of pilots, whether civil, commercial or military.  Several aviation schools are found within the immediate vicinity of the airport.  The airport is also a popular landing site for amateur pilots and aviation enthusiasts.

The airport is remembered as a historical landmark — one of the few airports in the Philippines with such a designation.

Incidents and accidents
Plaridel Airport was temporarily closed on July 9, 2007, following a crash involving two Cessna 150s that killed three persons: an instructor and a student from WCC Aviation School, and another student, Varsha Gopinanth, an Indian national and student at the Phoenix Aviation School.  Both planes were headed for Ninoy Aquino International Airport when they collided over Purok Ilang-Ilang, Barangay Ligas, Malolos at 12:55 p.m PST.
On March 17, 2018, 10 people which includes all 5 passengers and crew on the aircraft and a further 5 people on ground, were killed after a Piper PA-32 crashed into a residential area near the airport shortly after takeoff.
On September 17, 2021, a Cessna 152 plane with two pilots crashed in a vacant lot near the airport. Both pilots were injured, but managed to survive the crash.

References

Airports in the Philippines
Transportation in Bulacan
Buildings and structures in Bulacan
Transportation in Luzon